The Get a Grip Tour was a concert tour by American hard rock band Aerosmith that lasted over eighteen months, from early June 1993 to mid-December 1994. The tour was put on in support of the band's third consecutive multi-platinum album Get a Grip, released in April 1993.

Background
The Get a Grip Tour began June 2, 1993 in Topeka, Kansas and ended December 19, 1994 at the band's Mama Kin Music Hall in Boston, Massachusetts. In all, the band played approximately 240 shows, along with additional special performances.  To date, it is the second-longest tour in the band's history, eclipsed only by the Nine Lives Tour, which lasted for three years. However, the Get a Grip Tour holds the record for the most shows ever performed by Aerosmith on a single tour.

The tour saw the band play multiple legs across North America, Europe, Japan, and Central & South America. The tour marked the band's first performances in Central & South America, as well as a number of European nations, including Romania, Hungary, Poland, Russia, Turkey, Israel, Spain, Finland, Norway, the Czech Republic, and Austria.

Interspersed among regular show dates were a number of special television performances on programs such as Saturday Night Live, Late Show with David Letterman, MTV's Most Wanted, the MTV Video Music Awards, the Grammy Awards, and the MTV Europe Music Awards. The band also played a few club shows, in Los Angeles, London, and a surprise show at a local club in Sioux Falls, South Dakota after a concert there.

Highly of note was the band's performance at the Woodstock '94 festival in August 1994. The band closed the show on Saturday night, taking the stage at 1:15am to a crowd of 350,000 people. The band was originally supposed to start at Midnight, but due to a heavy downpour, the start time was delayed. Steven Tyler and Joey Kramer had attended the original Woodstock Festival in 1969.

Opening acts on the tour included Megadeth, Mighty Mighty Bosstones, Cry of Love, Jackyl, 4 Non Blondes, Soul Asylum, Therapy?, Collective Soul, Extreme, Brother Cane, Mr. Big, and Robert Plant in Argentina. Megadeth opened the band's first shows in June, but was fired as the opening act on July 17, after the band overheard Dave Mustaine talking poorly of Aerosmith in a radio interview, saying "Yeah, we think we oughta be headlining, but we don't mind because everyone knows this is Aerosmith's last hurrah." Steven Tyler replied, "Dave, we'd like to help you out. Which way did you come in?" Additionally, it turned out to not be "Aerosmith's last hurrah", since after the Get a Grip Tour, Aerosmith went on to embark on fourteen successful tours, release five Top 5 albums, chart five singles to the Billboard Hot 100 (including a #1 hit), and chart sixteen singles to the Mainstream Rock Tracks chart over the next 20 years.

By the end of the tour, Get a Grip had sold twelve million records worldwide, with six million copies sold in the United States alone (eventually selling seven million), charted four Top 40 hits, and won the band two Grammy Awards, four MTV Video Music Awards, two People's Choice Awards, two American Music Awards, and a Billboard Music Award.

In addition, the band's Geffen compilation Big Ones was released in November 1994. As a result, the new songs "Blind Man" and "Walk on Water" were included in the setlist during the final days of the tour. Those two tracks were recorded at a hotel on the island of Capri in July 1994, after the band's summer leg of dates in Europe.

During the show in Costa Rica on November 10, 1994, a fan was killed when the gates of the stadium were opened. The band had no idea this had happened and they played the show. After discovering the death of the fan, the band sent a special "Sorry" message through local networks for family and friends of the victim.

The band closed the tour with a performance at their recently opened Mama Kin Music Hall in Boston on December 19, 1994. The performance, which was heavy on 1970s classics, was broadcast on radio across North America.

Set list 
 "Intro"
 "Eat the Rich"
 "Toys in the Attic"
 "Fever"
 "What it Takes"
 "Amazing"
 "Rag Doll"
 "Cryin'"
 "Mama Kin"
 "Boogie Man"
 "Shut Up and Dance"
 "Walk on Down"
 "Stop Messin' Around"
 "Janie's Got a Gun"
 "Love in an Elevator"
 "Dude (Looks Like a Lady)"
 "Sweet Emotion"
 "Dream On"
 "Livin' on the Edge"
 "Walk This Way"

Tour dates

References

Citations

Sources
 

Aerosmith concert tours
1993 concert tours
1994 concert tours